Frederick Norris (4 September 1921 – 13 December 2006) was a British long-distance runner.

Athletics career
Born in Tyldesley, Norris competed in the 1952 Helsinki Olympics and in the 1956 Melbourne Olympics.

Fred Norris was born in Tyldesley, Lancashire. He left school at 14 to work in a machine shop before moving to Cleworth Hall Colliery in Tyldesley where he worked underground. As a young man he played football for local teams but switched to running after watching a newsreel film of Emil Zátopek's 10,000 metres victory in the 1948 London Olympics. He joined Leigh Harriers and then Bolton Harriers, training on the streets of Tyldesley in the early mornings before working 900 feet underground and running another eight to ten miles in the evenings.

Norris was seventh behind Zatopek in the 10,000 metres at the 1952 Helsinki Olympics and ran in the marathon a Melbourne in 1956. He held 54 English, British, Commonwealth and European records and in 1959 won the International Cross Country Championships. He was injured and missed the 1960 Rome Olympics. He moved to America where he had a successful career before retiring aged 42. In 1962 at age 40 ran a 4:21.9 mile (Masters Mile World Record), and he set a McNeese State school record in the two-mile 9:07.3. In 1986 he returned to Tyldesley and died there in 2006.

He won the bronze medal at the 1958 European Athletics Championships in Stockholm, Sweden, behind two Soviet runners: Sergei Popov and Ivan Filin. He competed in two consecutive Summer Olympics (1952, 1956).

He represented England in the 6 miles at the 1958 British Empire and Commonwealth Games in Cardiff, Wales.

Norris appeared on an episode of TV's To Tell The Truth in 1961 as himself.

He can be seen in film held by the Cinema Museum in London of the 1952 English Nationals Ref HMO362.

References

External links
 ARRS.net
 

1921 births
2006 deaths
People from Tyldesley
Sportspeople from Wigan
English male marathon runners
Olympic athletes of Great Britain
Athletes (track and field) at the 1952 Summer Olympics
Athletes (track and field) at the 1956 Summer Olympics
European Athletics Championships medalists
Athletes (track and field) at the 1958 British Empire and Commonwealth Games
International Cross Country Championships winners
Commonwealth Games competitors for England